Ronaldo Rudović (born 14 January 1995) is a Montenegrin footballer who plays for FK Mornar in the Montenegrin First League as a centre-back.

Club career

Vllaznia Shkodër
Rudović joined Albanian club Vllaznia Shkodër on a free transfer on 1 February 2016, where he was assigned number 18 for the second part of 2015–16 season. He made his league debut six days later, appearing as a 71st-minute substitute for Arsid Tafili in a 1–0 away defeat to Teuta Durrës. A week later, Rudović made his home debut, again as a substitute, during the 1–1 draw against Partizani Tirana.

FK Mornar
At the end of January 2019, Rudović joined FK Mornar in the Montenegrin First League.

International career
In 2015, he was called up to the Montenegro national under-19 football team.

Career statistics

Club

References

External links

1996 births
Living people
Montenegrin people of Albanian descent
Association football central defenders
Montenegrin footballers
SV Waldhof Mannheim players
KF Vllaznia Shkodër players
NK Novigrad players
FK Mornar players
Kategoria Superiore players
First Football League (Croatia) players
Montenegrin First League players
Montenegrin Second League players
Montenegrin expatriate footballers
Expatriate footballers in Albania
Montenegrin expatriate sportspeople in Albania
Expatriate footballers in Croatia
Montenegrin expatriate sportspeople in Croatia